The Hungarian Classic (previously called Hungarian Open) is a darts tournament held in Budapest, Hungary. Tournament was sanctioned by the World Darts Federation. The event has been organized every year since 1999. Three editions of this tournament were held in Győr. Hungarian Classic is a part of the Hungarian Masters weekend.

The first winners were Levente Székely and Kristina Pruim.

List of tournaments

Men's

Women's

Boys

Girls

Tournament records

 Most wins 2:  Dave Prins. 
 Most Finals 2:  Dave Prins,  Dietmar Burger,  Attila Szoke. 
 Most Semi Finals 4:  Nándor Bezzeg.
 Most Quarter Finals 7:  Nándor Bezzeg.
 Most Appearances 9:  Nándor Bezzeg,  Pal Szekely.
 Most Prize Money won €1387:  Ad van Haaren.
 Best winning average :  v's .
 Youngest Winner age 23:   Mareno Michels. 
 Oldest Winner age 43: Dave Prins.

References

External links
Hungarian Darts Federation.

1999 establishments in Hungary
Darts tournaments